East Dover is an unincorporated village in the town of Dover, Windham County, Vermont, United States. East Dover has a post office with ZIP code 05341.

References

Unincorporated communities in Windham County, Vermont
Unincorporated communities in Vermont